John Leslie Glaister DFC (21 December 1915 – 5 February 2005), known as Gerard or Gerrard Glaister, was a British television producer and director best known for his work with the BBC. Amongst his most notable successes as a producer were Colditz, The Brothers, Secret Army and Howards' Way.

After studying at RADA, Glaister made his West End debut in 1939. With the outbreak of war, he joined the Royal Air Force, commissioned as Pilot Officer on 8 September 1939 and initially flying a Blenheim bomber. He later served as a photo reconnaissance pilot in 208 Squadron RAF in the Western Desert, initially flying Westland Lysanders. It was during these latter duties that he was awarded the Distinguished Flying Cross on 6 October 1942, for a hazardous reconnaissance flight in an unarmed Hurricane at extremely low level across the Italian front line. He rose to the rank of Squadron Leader and retired from the RAF on 5 August 1952 (for medical reasons). Glaister later drew on his RAF experiences when, in 1963, he produced Moonstrike, a drama about an RAF squadron which ferried agents in and out of occupied Europe in Westland Lysanders. From 1962, he worked on the popular Dr Finlay's Casebook. His 1968 production The Expert is based on the work of his uncle, forensic scientist Prof John Glaister FRSE.

Glaister's success ended with the 1991 series Trainer, which was moved from prime time to a weeknight slot because of its perceived failure. However, it sold well overseas.

Glaister was married three times and had three daughters, two from his final marriage, to Joan.

Filmography

Producer
1958: Starr and Company
1958: Big Guns
1959: The Widow of Bath
1959: The Men From Room 13
1962: The Dark Island
1962: Dr. Finlay's Casebook
1963: Moonstrike
1967: The Revenue Men
1968: The Expert
1970: Codename
1971: The Passenger
1972: The Brothers
1972: Colditz
1975: Oil Strike North
1977: The Mackinnons
1977: Secret Army
1979: The Fourth Arm
1980: Buccaneer
1981: Blood Money
1981: Kessler
1983: Skorpion
1984: Cold Warrior
1984: Morgan's Boy
1985: Howards' Way
1991: Trainer

Writer
1968: The Expert
1972: The Brothers
1972: Colditz
1975: Oil Strike North
1975: You're On Your Own
1977: Secret Army
1979: The Fourth Arm
1985: Howards' Way

Director
1962: "The Set-up"
1962: The Dark Island
1962: Dr. Finlay's Casebook
1966: King of the River
1968: The Expert
1970: Codename
1975: Oil Strike North

References

External links
 
 Obituary Screen online

1915 births
2005 deaths
Alumni of RADA
BBC television producers
British television directors
British television producers
British television writers
British World War II bomber pilots
Recipients of the Distinguished Flying Cross (United Kingdom)
Royal Air Force officers
Royal Air Force pilots of World War II
20th-century screenwriters